Trevor Wilkinson (born 10 October 1960) is a former Zimbabwe and South African professional squash player.

Wilkinson was born on 10 October 1960 and lived in Cape Town, South Africa. He began to play squash at the age of 13 in Harare and won the South African Amateur Championship in 1981. He represented South Africa at international level before representing Zimbabwe.

References

External links
 

South African male squash players
1960 births
Place of birth missing (living people)
Sportspeople from Cape Town
Zimbabwean male squash players
Living people